Western supremacy: triumph of an idea? is a book about development studies, international relations and sociology written by award-winning Tunisian-born French historian, journalist, researcher, and feminist author Sophie Bessis.

According to Italian political philosophy professor Flavia Monceri, Sophie Bessis shows how notions of the West have been used to justify imperial economic interests and the emergence of a free trade ideology.  Monceri contends that what is peculiar to the West is not the mere fact of a successful hegemony, but rather the fact that ‘the nations of the West … are the only ones to have produced a theoretical (philosophical, moral and scientific) apparatus to legitimate it’.  A notion of supremacy actually underpins the last 500 years of Western history and that it still does – for example, in the assumptions underlying notions such as human rights and modernization. Furthermore, the West is not yet able to give up the belief in its own superiority, despite the increasing opposite signs that indicate it's becoming more and more a particular civilization amongst many others.

Le Monde's journalist Catherine Simon asserts: "Western supremacy, however radical its criticism may be, is not, however, an anti-American rant or yet another denunciation of the West - of which Renaissance Europe was the matrix. It is a history book, which asks questions and challenges, without complacency, the elites and the societies of the South."

Summary

According to a Stanford University book review, Sophie Bessis tells the story of "the West's relationship with the world it came to dominate - from the conquest of the Americas, through the slave trade and the Scramble for Africa, the White Man's burden, Manifest Destiny and the growth of scientific racism, to decolonisation, the ideology of development and structural adjustment. Western Supremacy is an introduction to the history of colonial and developmentalist thought. Starting with the Enlightenment idea of universalism it traces how this facilitated a notion of the West rooted in a Hellenic inheritance systematically devoid of Egyptian or Arab influences. Though the hierarchy of races has now given way to the hierarchy of development, Bessis argues that developmentalism is the new incarnation of the West's paradoxical aspiration to lead the world into universalism whilst maintaining its own supremacy. Attempts to emulate the Western model have had devastating consequences for the South. Human rights, democracy and justice, in theory at least, have become accepted throughout the world. Yet those who pride themselves on having invented this universality still lay claim to some privileged right to define its content. Bessis highlights the hypocrisy with which the North applies these standards: one standard for China, with its huge potential market, another for minor African states, one for Muslim oppression of women in Teheran, another in Riyadh. In other words, human rights are still entirely subordinate to economic interest."

Development of the Others is tolerated on the condition that it does not interfere with the West’s interests. Bessis concludes by exploring reactions within developing countries to the historically unprecedented attempt to remake the world in the West's own image. According to the author, the West's inability to embrace pluralism and multivocality undermines its very strength and the rightful existence and legitimate place that non-western peoples have in the world. Bessis concludes by asking the poignant question of how do we collectively move from a unitary domination by the West to a body of ideas and a discourse in which all members of humanity can recognize themselves and share in its construction. 

According to Maliha Chishti, Bessis insists that development ideology exhorted the world to embrace the universality and inevitability of modernity and progress—but only on the condition that their development and modernization do not interfere with the West's interests. Furthermore, Bessis concedes that although the West does not want to admit or submit to this direction, it inevitably will be pushed, either willingly or unwillingly, to finally locate itself realistically in the world.

According to Philippe Dewitte, Bessis sees the emergence of a South that would be capable of inventing an original modernity, a universalism that would no longer be a façade, a "model of development" different from that brandished by the West.

Contents

Part 1: The formation of a culture 
1. The West Is Born : Birth of a myth - The horsemen of the Apocalypse - The bleeding of Africa 
2. Light and Shadow of the Enlightenment : America and slavery - Limited universality - A moment of hesitation 
3. The Roots of a Conviction : The proof by race... - ...and its applications - In the name of civilization - Europeanizing the world - The limits of progress 
4. Continuity beneath Wrenching Changes : The textbook world - Communist contradictions - Around Nazism - Colonial upheavals - The period of doubts - Alternative messiahs? - An economic model 
5. The Backlash : A new discourse - From the restoration of myths - ...to the rewriting of histories - The end of an era?

Part 2: The way of the world
6. The Great Post-Colonial Illusion : The 'development decades' - Two variants of a single model - The State as demiurge - Beneficiaries in the South 
7. The New Basis of Hegemony : The constancy of wealth - The debt economy - The debt dividend - Crisis and adjustment programmes - Technologies of constraint 
8. The Privileges of Power : Making use of liberalism - The loaded dice of free trade - Some more equal than others - A huge bill - Immigration, memory and amnesia - Barriers against the Other - Vagaries of the right to asylum - A model in question 
9. Beginning of the End? : Hegemony wounded - A grouping of enemies - Troubles in the North - The incarnation of evil - Nostalgia for the State - Winners and losers

Part 3: The two sides of the mirror
10. The New Look of Universality : The geography of law - Selective morality - Logics of interference 
11. The Same and the Others : The reemergence of the Other - ...and the return of threats - The new main enemy - The Others in cast-off clothes - The Same in its various declensions - The fortunes of a term - The assignation of difference 
12. On the Other Side of the Mirror : Revenge of the past - Memory cults - The ruses of omnipotence - Identity dictatorships - Making use of traditions - Towards new modernities? Conclusion.

See also

Cultural hegemony
Hellenocentrism
Multiculturalism
Orientalism
White supremacy
White nationalism

References

Further reading

Bessis, Sophie (2003). Western Supremacy: The Triumph of an Idea?  Zed Books.   
Dunbar-Ortiz, Roxanne (2015). An indigenous peoples' history of the United States. Beacon Press, Boston.  
Lindqvist, Sven (1996). Exterminate all the brutes.  New Press, New York.  
Said, Edward (1978). Orientalism. Pantheon Books.  
Van der Pijl, Kees (2014). The Discipline of Western Supremacy: Modes of Foreign Relations and Political Economy, Volume III, Pluto Press,

External links
 Amazon.com's book reviews and description
 Barnes & Noble's editorial reviews and overview
 Goodreads book review
 Waterstones book review
 Full text from archive.org
 From Project Muse Books Received JF - Journal of the History of Ideas VL - 64 IS - 4 SP - 661 EP - 668 PY - 2003 PB - University of Pennsylvania Press SN - 1086-3222 N1 - Volume 64, Number 4, October 2003 ER

2003 non-fiction books
Anti-imperialism
Neoliberalism
Colonialism
Books about political power